Lenin Guillermo Porozo Quintero (born July 7, 1990) is an Ecuadorian footballer currently playing for El Nacional. He plays as a midfielder for his club.

Club career
Porozo came out as a professional at Barcelona SC. Porozo's first start in the major was in April 2007, he then again made another aparences in February 2008. Recently the new head coach of Barcelona, Juan Manuel Llop requested his presence this year.

References

External links
Ecuafutbol profile
El Universo

1990 births
Living people
Sportspeople from Guayaquil
Association football midfielders
Ecuadorian footballers
Barcelona S.C. footballers
C.D. ESPOLI footballers
C.S.D. Independiente del Valle footballers
C.D. El Nacional footballers